Yevgeny Aleksandrovich Korovin (– 23 November 1964) was a Soviet jurist specializing in international law. He was a prominent early scholar of space law and is "considered the founder of the Russian science of space law, in whose origin he played a singular role." Korovin held several academic and legal positions at Moscow State University, the United Nations, and the Permanent Court of Arbitration in the Hague.

Biography 
Korovin graduated from the Moscow State University Faculty of Law in 1915. In his early career, Korovin lectured in numerous universities and institutes of higher learning in Moscow, including the Diplomatic Academy.

In 1923 he became a Professor of Law at Moscow State University. At this time, Prof. Korovin was also an assistant of the Institute of Soviet Law, the forerunner of the Institute of State and Law of the Academy of Sciences of the Soviet Union.

In 1935, he became a Member of American Academy of Political Science. In 1938, he defended doctor thesis LLD (habilitation) in law. He worked in the military legal academy of the Soviet Army, and had a short stint working for the United Nations Preparatory Commission between 1945 and 1946. He became a Corresponding Member of the Academy of Sciences of the Soviet Union in 1946, and a Member of Permanent Court of Arbitration in the Hague in 1957.

Bibliography

«Международное право переходного времени», М., 1924 г. (International Law of the Transition Period)

References

Citations

Sources

See also
Russian legal history
History of international law in Russia
List of Russian legal historians

1892 births
1964 deaths
Lawyers from Moscow
Corresponding Members of the USSR Academy of Sciences
Members of the Permanent Court of Arbitration
Professors of the Moscow State University
Recipients of the Order of Lenin
Recipients of the Order of the Red Banner of Labour
International law scholars
Russian legal scholars
Soviet judges of international courts and tribunals

Burials at Novodevichy Cemetery